Lydia Boquera de Buen (born November 26, 1963 in Barcelona) known professionally as Lydia Bosch is a Spanish actress and television presenter. She has appeared in more than thirty films since 1985.

Selected filmography

Films

Television

References

External links
 

1963 births
Living people
Spanish film actresses
Spanish television actresses
Spanish television presenters
People from El Prat de Llobregat
Spanish women television presenters
20th-century Spanish actresses
21st-century Spanish actresses